The 2001 Tanduay Rhum Masters season was the final season of the franchise in the Philippine Basketball Association (PBA).

Draft picks

Transactions

Occurrences
Purefoods coach Derrick Pumaren didn't renew his contract with the Hotdogs and has moved over to become the new head coach of Tanduay Rhum Masters, replacing Alfrancis Chua. 

During the off-season, Tanduay tendered an offer sheet to the league's two-time MVP, San Miguel center Danny Ildefonso. The contract stipulated P96 million in 16 years which was met by stiff criticisms from the PBA Commissioner's Office. The Rhum Masters were ordered to rework the deal but instead of coming up with a revised offer sheet, Tanduay simply gave up in their bid to get Ildefonso. 

Purefoods guard Dindo Pumaren, who played eight games with the Hotdogs during the All-Filipino Cup, was acquired by Tanduay upon his desire to play alongside his brother-coach, Purefoods shipped him to the Rhum Masters in favor of a future trade pick. 

Fil-Am Eric Menk was not allowed to play in the first two conferences as he awaits a confirmation from the Department of Justice regarding his status.

Tanduay sold its franchise to Airfreight 2100 the following year, giving away their top players first by trading them to other teams.

Roster

 Team Manager: Chito Bugia

Elimination round

Games won

References

Tanduay
Tanduay Rhum Masters seasons